Al-Ḥusayn ibn ʿAlī al-ʿĀbid was an Alid who rebelled at Medina against the Abbasid caliph al-Hadi. He was killed with many of his followers at the Battle of Fakhkh outside Mecca on 11 June 786, whence he is known to history as the Man of Fakhkh.

Family and early life
Both of his parents were renowned for their piety, to the point that his father volunteered to join his Alid relatives who were imprisoned by the Abbasid caliph al-Mansur in 758 and 762, dying in prison in 763. Muhammad al-Nafs al-Zakiyya, who led a major Alid revolt in Medina against the Abbasids in 762, was a brother of Husayn's mother.

Husayn thus grew up in what the historian Laura Veccia Vaglieri describes as "an atmosphere of extreme piety and of secret hatred for the Abbasids". Nevertheless, Husayn had friendly relations with the third Abbasid caliph, al-Mahdi, who gave him money and released an Alid prisoner at Husayn's intercession. According to Veccia Vaglieri, "[t]here exist many anecdotes about his love for the poor, his charity, his inability to understand the value of money and his boundless generosity".

Revolt

Shortly after Caliph al-Mahdi died in July 785, Husayn and his followers rose in revolt at Medina, hoping to take advantage of the as yet unstable position of al-Mahdi's successor, al-Hadi. Probably on 16 May 786, Husayn and his fellow conspirators  tried to seize control of Medina.

The rebels failed to rally the ordinary people to their cause, however, and were quickly confronted by the local garrison. Over the following days, the partisans of the Alids (the 'wearers of white') and the Abbasids (the 'wearers of black') clashed repeatedly, but the latter emerged victorious, confining the Alids and their partisans to the precinct of the Great Mosque. With his uprising clearly a failure, Husayn left the city for Mecca on 28 May, with some 300 followers. 

In the ensuing battle, Husayn and over a hundred of his followers were killed, and many taken prisoner. Many Alids managed to escape the battle by mingling with the Hajj pilgrims. Among them were Idris and Yahya, the brothers of Muhammad al-Nafs al-Zakiyya. Idris eventually moved to the Maghreb, and in 789 established the Idrisid dynasty in the area of modern Morocco, while his brother Yahya raised a revolt in Daylam in 792.

References

Sources
 
 
 

786 deaths
Hasanids
Rebels from the Abbasid Caliphate
People killed in action
8th-century people from the Abbasid Caliphate
Arab rebels
8th-century Arabs